Scott Russell Johnson (November 27, 1961  December 8, 1988) was an American university student who was killed in Australia in 1988. Initially treated by police as a suicide, a coroner's inquest in 2017 resulted in finding "[he] died as a result of a gay-hate attack". In May 2020, an Australian man was arrested and charged and in January 2022, convicted in the murder of Johnson, citing homophobia as his motivation.

Background

Scott Russell Johnson was born on November 27, 1961, in Los Angeles County, California, United States. In 1983, he moved to England to study mathematics at the University of Cambridge. At Cambridge, he met Michael Noone, a musicologist from Australia with whom he fell in love. In 1986, Johnson left his doctoral program at the University of California, Berkeley and moved to Canberra on a student visa to complete his PhD at the Australian National University and to be with Noone.

Death
Johnson's naked body was found on rocks at the foot of cliffs at Blue Fish Point in North Head near Manly, New South Wales, on 10 December 1988. His clothes and belongings were found on top of the cliff. Police initially claimed that his death was a case of suicide, which his brother, Steve Johnson, disputed.

Aftermath
Steve Johnson campaigned for decades for his brother's death to be re-investigated. Family campaigning had led to coroners investigations in 2012 and 2015 that recommended that police reopen the case. No action was taken until 2017 when a coroner found that Johnson had died as a result of a hate crime. Police offered an A$1 million reward in 2018 for information. His family raised the reward to A$2 million in March 2020.

The conclusion that Johnson's death was the result of a hate crime drew attention to other homophobic killings around Sydney beaches in the 1980s. It is now estimated that as many as 80 gay men were murdered in Sydney in the late 1980s, many pushed off cliffs. The New South Wales Police Force has since apologised for not investigating the murder of Johnson properly and failing to protect the gay community.

On 12 May 2020, a 49-year-old man was arrested ln Lane Cove and charged with the murder of Johnson. After being contacted about the arrest, Steve Johnson said: "This is a very emotional day, he was my best friend and he really needed me to do this." Steve Johnson also hopes that the arrest will open the doors for others to receive justice. He said, "I hope the family and friends of the other dozens of gay men who lost their lives find solace in what's happened today."

On 13 January 2022, Scott White was found guilty of murdering Scott Johnson in 1988 after changing his plea to guilty.  He originally pleaded not-guilty but changed it on 10 January 2022 to guilty. His lawyer tried to have it withdrawn the next day under the guise of White being unfit to make the admission but the Supreme Court rejected the motion. On 3 May, White was sentenced to 12 years and 7 months, with non-parole period of 8 years and 3 months, based on laws at the time of the murder and White's own personal circumstances. The judge said, "That it was a gay hate crime is not a conclusion that the Court can reach to the criminal standard however".

See also 

 Gay Gang Murders

References

1988 deaths
American people murdered abroad
Deaths by person in Australia
December 1988 events in Australia
Gay academics
Male murder victims
1988 murders in Australia
Violence against gay men
1961 births